Omotayo Aramide Oduntan (born June 5, 1957), is a Nigerian politician representing Alimosho II Constituency at the Lagos State House of Assembly under the platform of the All Progressives Congress.

Life and career
She was born in Lagos State, Southwestern Nigeria, where she completed her primary and secondary school education. She holds a certificate and diploma in Food Hygiene and Food Handling from the Royal Institute of Public Health. She once served as the Senior Special Assistant to the Governor of Lagos State on Grassroot Matters while serving as a member of Lagos State House of Assembly from 1999 to 2003 and from 2011 to 2015. She presently serves as the Chief Whip of the 8th Assembly of the Lagos State House of Assembly.

References

External links
Profile at Lagos State House of Assembly

1957 births
Living people
Lagos State politicians
Nigerian women in politics
All Progressives Congress politicians
Yoruba women in politics
People from Lagos State
Women in Lagos politics